The 2019 Forest of Dean District Council election was held on 2 May 2019 as part of the 2019 United Kingdom local elections. This was the first election in the Forest of Dean following a boundary review, which reduced the total number of Councillors from 48 to 38. Due to the boundary review, party seat changes in the summary box (right) are based on notional results, not the actual 2015 results.

Summary

Background

Only the Conservatives fielded candidates for all 38 seats. The Green Party fielded 27 candidates, Labour 24, the Liberal Democrats 5 and UKIP 2. There were 24 independent candidates.

A Green Party candidate standing in Newen & Taynton ward, David Richard Humphreys, died whilst canvassing for the party, causing the election to be postponed to 20 June 2019.

Election result

|-

Council composition

Changes since the 2015 election are due to defections and by-elections.

Aftermath

Following the election, an administration was formed between the Independents, Green and Labour councillors. Tim Gwilliam, an Independent councillor who had served as leader of the council since July 2017, was re-elected as leader. A cabinet was formed consisting of two Independents, two Green and two Labour members.

Ward results

Berry Hill

Bream

Cinderford East

Cinderford West

Coleford

Dymock

Hartpury & Redmarley

Longhope & Huntley

Lydbrook

Lydney East

Lydney North

Lydney West & Aylburton

Mitcheldean, Ruardean & Drybrook

Newent & Taynton

On 29 April 2019, it was announced that David Richard Humphreys died whilst canvassing for the Green Party. The election for the ward was then held on 20 June.

Newland & Sling

Newnham

Pillowell

Ruspidge

St Briavels

Tidenham

Westbury-on-Severn

By-elections

Berry Hill

Cinderford East

References

2019 English local elections
May 2019 events in the United Kingdom
2019
2010s in Gloucestershire